Stereocaulon capitellatum is a species of snow lichen belonging to the family Stereocaulaceae.

Ecology
Stereocaulon capitellatum is a known host to the lichenicolous fungus species:

 Arthonia stereocaulina
 Opegrapha stereocaulicola
 Polycoccum trypethelioides

References

Stereocaulaceae
Lichen species
Taxa named by Adolf Hugo Magnusson
Lichens described in 1926